Princess Consort Shao of Wei, also known as Empress Tudan, was the wife of the seventh emperor of the Jurchen-led Chinese Jin dynasty, Wanyan Yongji. After her husband was killed, she was stripped of her title and banished to Zhengzhou.

Biography
Lady Tudan became Empress of Jin in 1209. When Hushahu rebelled in 1213, she moved with her husband to the region of Wei. Later in the year, her husband was killed and Wudubu ascended the throne as Emperor Xuanzong. Xuanzong demoted Wuyan Yongji to Marquis of Donghai and demoted Empress Tudan. In 1214, the Jin capital was moved to Bianjing, and the Emperor decreed that all members of Wanyan Yongji's family be imprisoned in Zhengzhou with no option to leave. It was further decreed that the family's men and women would not be permitted to marry for 19 years. In 1232, Emperor Aizong lifted the restriction on movement. By this time, the Jin could not hold Henan, and it is not known what happened to the former Empress or her descendants.

Family
Spouse: Wanyan Yongji, Prince Shao of Wei (d. 11 September 1213)

References

13th-century women
1168 births
Year of death unknown
Jin dynasty (1115–1234) empresses